Plaksino is a rural locality (a village) in Krasnopolyanskoye Rural Settlement, Nikolsky District, Vologda Oblast, Russia. The population was 65 as of 2002.

Geography 
Plaksino is located 11 km southeast of Nikolsk (the district's administrative centre) by road. Dor is the nearest rural locality.

References 

Rural localities in Nikolsky District, Vologda Oblast